William Bourer (died 1422) was a sheep farmer and the member of the Parliament of England for Salisbury for the parliament of 1410.

References 

Members of Parliament for Salisbury
Year of birth unknown
1422 deaths
15th-century English farmers
English MPs 1410